Majlinda Bregu (born 19 May 1974) is an Albanian politician and diplomat. She served as Minister of European Integration and Government Spokeswoman from 2007 to 2013 in the Berisha cabinet. A member of the Albanian Parliament from 2005 until 2017 representing Tirana County, since January 2019 she is the Secretary-General of the Regional Cooperation Council.

Education
Bregu obtained a bachelor's degree in Social Sciences at the University of Tirana in 1996. The following year she was a visiting student at Montreal (Canada), Oslo (Norway) and Frankfurt am Oder (Germany).

She held a master's degree in social policy at the University of Tirana in 2003. She has a PhD from Urbino University in Italy with a thesis entitled "Sociology of cultural phenomena's and normative process".

Career
From 1996 and 2007 she worked as Full-Time Lecturer at the Social Sciences Faculty in the University of Tirana.

During the student years, she began her TV media experience, first as translator, then anchorperson and Journalist at the National Albanian Television. 
In 2004 she got appointed as the coordinator of Social Policies at the Political Orientation Committee of the Democratic Party. Then she became a Member of the National Council of the Party in April 2004.
During the general election of 2005, she was declared as a candidate for parliament, representing Tirana.

Legislative proposals
Personal key legislative initiatives on EUI and Human Rights protection (7 enacted legal acts).

In January 2014, in the Law Commission, Bregu proposes amendments to the (Albanian) Civil Code, which would force the administrators of online media, websites and social networks to censor the comments of visitors on the ground of being offensive to "the dignity, personality and image of a woman".

Publications 

"Europe, Back & Forth", 2014;

"Monitoring of Media on Domestic Violence, co-author 2003, -2004;

"Manual for judges & prosecutors dealing with Gender Based Violence";

"Children trafficking in Albania", Co-author 2005;

"Research methods in Social Sciences", co-author,2003.

References

1974 births
Living people
Democratic Party of Albania politicians
University of Tirana alumni
Integration ministers of Albania
University of Urbino alumni
21st-century Albanian politicians
21st-century Albanian women politicians
Government ministers of Albania
Women government ministers of Albania
Members of the Parliament of Albania
Women members of the Parliament of Albania